Sandwich Community Unit School District #430 is a school district headquartered in Sandwich, Illinois, United States.

History
The district started with the community's first school, Herman E. Dummer School, located just north of the current district headquarters on Wells Street in Sandwich.  The district grew to accommodate the growth of the community: there are now   three elementary schools, a transitional school for kids in 4th and 5th Grade, a junior high school, and a high school.  There have been plans to build a new high school to eliminate overcrowding at the current high school for around ten years, with no definitive plans gone ahead with.  A picture of Dummer Elementary ended up on the 'Tonight Show with Jay Leno' during its "Headlines" segment, due to the school's unusual name and spelling, which is still displayed on the main entrance of the school.

IVVC (Indian Valley Vocational Center)
The school district also works with the Indian Valley Vocational Center, which serves as a High School level training center for students, which they attend in the first half of the school day, and they return to their home school for the second half.  The center serves CUSD 9 (Earlville), CUSD 429 (Hinckley-Big Rock), CUSD 1 (Leland), CUSD 271 (Paw Paw), CUSD 430 (Sandwich), CUSD 432 (Somonauk), CUSD 425 (Indian Creek/Waterman-Shabbona), CUSD 18 (Newark), CUSD 88 (Plano), CUSD 2 (Serena-Sheridan), and CUSD 115 (Yorkville).

Elementary schools

Intermediate school

Junior high school

High school

References

External links

 District profile
 School Report Cards

Education in DeKalb County, Illinois
Sandwich, Illinois
School districts in Illinois